2-Cyanoacetamide is an organic compound. It is an acetic amide with a nitrile functional group.

Uses
Cyanoacetamide is used in spectrofluorimetric methods to determine the activity of antihistamine H1 receptor antagonistic drugs such as ebastine, cetirizine dihydrochloride and fexofenadine hydrochloride.

Preparation
2-Cyanoacetamide is prepared from chloroacetic acid via Kolbe nitrile synthesis followed by Fischer esterification and ester aminolysis.

See also
Chloroacetamide
Ethyl chloroacetate

References

Acetamides
Nitriles